Francois de Lorraine (1506–1525) was the Lord of Lambesc, and a commander in the French army under Francis I of France. He was a son of René II, Duke of Lorraine and Philippa of Guelders. He commanded the Black Band of renegade Landsknechts at the Battle of Pavia, and in the bitter combat that ensued between the Black Band and Frundsberg's Imperial Landsknechts, Lorraine was killed.

References

Sources

1506 births
1525 deaths
Military leaders of the Italian Wars
French military personnel killed in action
16th-century French people